Aambal Poovu is a 1981 Indian Malayalam film, directed by Harikumar and produced by Soumyachithra. The film stars Sukumari, Jagathy Sreekumar, Jose and Prakash in the lead roles. The film has musical score by V. Dakshinamoorthy.

Cast

Sukumari
Jagathy Sreekumar
Jose
Prakash
Sukumaran
Chithran
Dhanya
Jalaja
Janardanan
K. G. Warrier
P. K. Venukkuttan Nair
Roopa
Sasidharan
Suchitra

Soundtrack
The music was composed by V. Dakshinamoorthy and the lyrics were written by Kavalam Narayana Panicker.

References

External links
 

Films shot in Kollam
1981 films
1980s Malayalam-language films